Wall Doxey (August 8, 1892March 2, 1962) was an American politician from Holly Springs, Mississippi. He served as a Democrat from Mississippi's 2nd congressional district in the United States House of Representatives from 1929 to 1941. After the death of U.S. Senator Pat Harrison, Doxey won a special election to his seat, and served in the United States Senate from 1941 until 1943. He was defeated in the 1942 Democratic primary by James Eastland.

Throughout his political career, Doxey represented a district with a black-majority population, whose political affiliation in the nineteenth century had been with the Republican Party. But, African Americans were effectively excluded from the political system from 1890 to the late 1960s by Mississippi's constitution and restrictions affecting voter registration. Doxey was the only United States Senator to serve also as the Senate Sergeant at Arms. He was appointed to this position after losing his Senate seat, serving from February 1, 1943, to January 3, 1947.

Wall Doxey State Park, a state park in Mississippi, is named after him.

References

External links
 
"Wall Doxey", Senate Biography

1892 births
1962 deaths
Sergeants at Arms of the United States Senate
Democratic Party United States senators from Mississippi
Democratic Party members of the United States House of Representatives from Mississippi
20th-century American politicians
People from Holly Springs, Mississippi
Burials at Hillcrest Cemetery